The 2023 UEFA Europa League Final will be the final match of the 2022–23 UEFA Europa League, the 52nd season of Europe's secondary club football tournament organised by UEFA, and the 14th season since it was renamed from the UEFA Cup to the UEFA Europa League. The match will be played at the Puskás Aréna in Budapest, Hungary on 31 May 2023. Due to the postponement and relocation of the 2020 final, the final hosts were shifted back a year, with Budapest instead hosting the 2023 final.

The winners will earn the right to play against the winners of the 2022–23 UEFA Champions League in the 2023 UEFA Super Cup.

Venue
The match will be the first UEFA Cup/Europa League final to be held in Budapest, and the second final in the competition's history to be held in Hungary after the 1985 first leg. The final will also be the third UEFA club competition final to be held in the city after the 2019 UEFA Women's Champions League Final and the 2020 UEFA Super Cup, making it the fourth overall UEFA club final in Hungary. The stadium was also chosen as a venue for UEFA Euro 2020, where it hosted three group stage matches and a round of 16 fixture.

Host selection
The Puskás Aréna was selected as the final host by the UEFA Executive Committee during their meeting in Amsterdam, Netherlands on 2 March 2020.

On 17 June 2020, the UEFA Executive Committee announced that due to the postponement and relocation of the 2020 final, Budapest would instead host the 2023 final.

Pre-match

Identity 
The original identity of the 2023 UEFA Europa League Final was unveiled at the group stage draw on 26 August 2022.

Ambassador 
The ambassador for the final is former Hungarian international Zoltán Gera, who finished as runner-up in the 2009–10 UEFA Europa League with Fulham.

Match

Details
The "home" team (for administrative purposes) was determined by an additional draw held after the quarter-final and semi-final draws.

See also
2023 UEFA Champions League Final
2023 UEFA Europa Conference League Final
2023 UEFA Women's Champions League Final
2023 UEFA Super Cup

Notes

References

External links

2023
Final
Scheduled association football competitions
May 2023 sports events in Europe
2022–23 in Hungarian football
International sports competitions in Budapest
2020s in Budapest
International club association football competitions hosted by Hungary